The following is a list of the seven municipalities (comuni) of the Province of Prato, Tuscany, Italy. The capital of the province is in bold.

List

See also 
List of municipalities of Italy

References 

Prato